St. Joseph's Catholic Church is a historic Black Catholic church located at 1012 French Street in Wilmington, New Castle County, Delaware. It was added to the National Register of Historic Places in 2004.

History 
St. Joseph's was founded by the Josephites, who established community services for the Wilmington African-American community dating from the late-1880s.

It later changed hands, ending up with the Franciscans, who relinquished administration in Fall 2020 to the Diocese of Wilmington.

Building 
The current complex was built to replace the previous church and rectory destroyed by a fire in 1945. It was built in 1947, and is a -story, three bay, brick and cast stone church building with a gable roof.  It is in the late Gothic Revival style.

The rectory is a two-story, three bay brick and cast stone building constructed in 1954.  It is connected to the church by a one-story hyphen.

References

African-American historic places
Gothic Revival church buildings in Delaware
Roman Catholic churches completed in 1947
20th-century Roman Catholic church buildings in the United States
Roman Catholic churches in Wilmington, Delaware
Churches on the National Register of Historic Places in Delaware
African-American history of Delaware
National Register of Historic Places in Wilmington, Delaware
1947 establishments in Delaware
Roman Catholic churches in Delaware
African-American Roman Catholic churches